Dirgin is an unincorporated community in Rusk County, located in the U.S. state of Texas. According to the Handbook of Texas, the community had a population of 12 in 2000. It is located within the Longview, Texas metropolitan area.

History
A post office was established at Dirgin in 1898 and remained in operation until 1918. It had two general stores, a sawmill, and 100 residents in 1914. It lost three-quarters of its population in 1933 and had only one business. By 1940, it still had only one business, a church, and several scattered houses. The population went up to 50 during that decade, but then dropped to 12 in the 1960s through 2000.

Geography

Education
In 1907, Dirgin had two schools. One had 33 White students and one teacher, and the other had 92 Black students and one teacher. Today, the community is served by the Tatum Independent School District.

Notes

Unincorporated communities in Cherokee County, Texas
Unincorporated communities in Texas